The Istituto Centrale per gli Archivi (ICAR) is the Italian Central Institute for Archives. The building is on Viale Castro Pretorio in Rome.

External links 
 

Buildings and structures in Rome